Abigail × Ivorian Doll was a musical collaboration.

You might be looking for:

 Abigail Asante
 Ivorian Doll